Chapi-chapi is a small two-stick kite that can be quickly constructed from cheap materials such as newspapers, broom sticks, or discarded plastic sheet. It is very popular in the Philippines. The name itself colloquially means, "assembled fast" or "quickly improvised". A strong, straight stick is used for the vertical frame. The horizontal stick is tensioned into a bow in order to provide greater support for the paper or plastic sheet. A very long bottom tail is almost always necessary, while the side tails or fins are optional.

This kite, with a simple two-point bridle, has moderate lateral roll and flutter (oscillation), that some kite fliers prefer in kite fighting, over stable, quiet flight. Unlike the diamond-shaped Malay kite and Eddy, no extra strings are used in the edges for the frame, making the chapi-chapi easier and faster to assemble but relatively more fragile. The chapi-chapi is quite similar but not identical to the Thai "female" kite called , to the Patang or Indian fighter kite, and to the Nagasaki Hata or Matt Star fighter kite.

The kite shown in the 1999 Filipino film Saranggola was a chapi-chapi.

See also
 Fighter kite

References

External links
Kite Index Link Directory, For All Kite Related Websites.*

Kites